Peter Valdemars Bumbers (16 March 1926 – 1984) was an Australian basketball player of Latvian ethnicity. He competed in the men's tournament at the 1956 Summer Olympics.

References

1926 births
1984 deaths
Australian men's basketball players
Olympic basketball players of Australia
Basketball players at the 1956 Summer Olympics
Basketball players from Riga
Latvian emigrants to Australia